Orquesta Sinfónica Nacional Juvenil may refer to:

 National Youth Symphony Orchestra of Chile
 National Youth Symphony Orchestra of the Dominican Republic